Kleanthis Palaiologos was Greek coach and writer. Βorn in 1902 in Athens and grew up in Mytilene. His father was called papa-Hastas or papa-Palaiologos and was a priest. He was for 15 years a member of SEGAS, the Hellenic Olympic Committee, as well as founding member and vice president of the International Olympic Academy. Palaiologos was honored by the Greek state with the Order of the Phoenix.

Kleanthis Palaiologos was an author heavily inspired by the Olympic games and the Olympic spirit. 

He died on 25 August 1990.

References 
''The first version of the article is translated and is based from the article at the Greek Wikipedia (:el:el:Main Page)

1902 births
1990 deaths
Writers from Athens
Greek gymnasts
Recipients of the Order of the Phoenix (Greece)
Sportspeople from Athens
People from Mytilene